Goold is a surname. Notable people with the surname include:

 James Goold, Baron Goold (1923–1997), Scottish businessman and Conservative politician
 Thomas Goold (1766?–1846), Irish lawyer and politician
 Vere St. Leger Goold (1853–1909), Irish tennis player, first Irish champion, later convicted murderer
 William Henry Goold (1815-1897) Moderator of the General Assembly for the Free Church of Scotland 1877/78.

See also 
 Gould (name)